Jianzhou or Jian Prefecture was a zhou (prefecture) in imperial China centering on modern Jian'ou, Fujian, China. It existed (intermittently) from 621 to 1162.

Geography
The administrative region of Jianzhou in the Tang dynasty falls within modern northern Fujian. It probably includes modern: 
Under the administration of Nanping:
Jian'ou
Wuyishan
Jianyang District
Shaowu
Zhenghe County
Under the administration of Ningde:
Shouning County
Zhouning County

References
 

Prefectures of the Tang dynasty
Prefectures of the Song dynasty
Prefectures of Min Kingdom
Prefectures of Southern Tang
Former prefectures in Fujian